The Tods Corner Power Station is a pumped-storage hydroelectric power station located in the Central Highlands region of Tasmania, Australia. The power station is situated on the Great Lake and South Esk catchment and is owned and operated by Hydro Tasmania.

Technical details
Located in the Great Lake and South Esk catchment area, the Tods Corner Power Station was developed to recover the available energy from the water out of the
Arthurs Lake Pumping Station. In order to increase the size of the reservoir at the Great Lake, and increase the water available to the important Waddamana Power Stations, Arthurs Lake was created in the 1920s with the damming of several creeks and water was pumped from it into the Great Lake as required by the station. With the construction of the much larger Poatina Power Station in 1966 to replace Waddamana, Tods Corner was added to recover some of the energy used by the pump systems. The power station is located on the south-eastern shore of Great Lake and is supplied with water via a -long penstock connected to an open flume which carries the discharge from Arthurs Lake Pumping Station.

Commissioned in 1966 by the Hydro Electric Corporation (TAS), the station has a single Maier Francis-type turbine with capacity of  coupled to a Siemens induction generator. The station output, estimated at  annually, is fed to TasNetworks' transmission grid at its output voltage of 6.6 kV via a circuit breaker located in the exterior switchyard.

See also

List of power stations in Tasmania

References

Energy infrastructure completed in 1966
Hydroelectric power stations in Tasmania
Central Highlands (Tasmania)